Victor Lay (26 August 1897 – 1 March 1979) was a British wrestler. He competed in the freestyle light heavyweight event at the 1924 Summer Olympics.

References

External links
 

1897 births
1979 deaths
Olympic wrestlers of Great Britain
Wrestlers at the 1924 Summer Olympics
British male sport wrestlers
People from Eye, Suffolk